is a former Japanese football player. She played for Japan national team.

Club career
Shimokozuru was born in Nagaokakyo on 7 June 1982. In 1999, she joined Matsushita Electric Panasonic Bambina (later Speranza FC Takatsuki) from youth team. In 2005, she graduated from Kansai University and moved to Tasaki Perule FC. She was selected Best Eleven in 2005, 2006. However, in 2008, the club was disbanded due to financial strain and she retired. In May 2009, she came back at Speranza FC Takatsuki. In 2010, she moved to TEPCO Mareeze. However, the club was disbanded for Fukushima Daiichi nuclear disaster in 2011. She moved to new club Vegalta Sendai and played as captain. She retired end of 2013 season.

National team career
In April 2004, Shimokozuru was selected Japan national team for 2004 Summer Olympics qualification. At this competition, on 18 April, she debuted against Vietnam. She was a member of Japan for 2004 Summer Olympics. She also played at 2006, 2008 Asian Cup and 2006 Asian Games. She played 28 games for Japan until 2008.

National team statistics

References

External links

 http://www.gettyimages.ae/photos/aya-shimokozuru?excludenudity=true&sort=mostpopular&mediatype=photography&phrase=aya%20shimokozuru

1982 births
Living people
Kansai University alumni
Association football people from Kyoto Prefecture
Japanese women's footballers
Japan women's international footballers
Olympic footballers of Japan
Footballers at the 2004 Summer Olympics
Asian Games medalists in football
Footballers at the 2006 Asian Games
Women's association football defenders
Asian Games silver medalists for Japan
Medalists at the 2006 Asian Games